The men's individual all-around competition was one of eight events for male competitors in artistic gymnastics at the 1972 Summer Olympics in Munich. The qualification and final rounds took place on 27, 29 and 30 August at the Sports Hall. There were 113 competitors from 26 nations. Each nation could send a team of 6 gymnasts or up to 3 individual gymnasts. The event was won by Sawao Kato of Japan, the third man to successfully defend an Olympic title in the event; it was Japan's third consecutive victory in the event (matching the Soviet Union for second-most at that point after Italy's four). The Japanese gymnasts swept the medals, with Eizo Kenmotsu earning silver and Akinori Nakayama. Kato and Nakayama, who had also taken bronze in 1968, were the eighth and ninth men to win multiple medals overall in the event. It was the first medal sweep in the event since France did it in the first edition in 1900. This broke the Soviet Union's five-Games medal streak, with their best gymnast (Nikolai Andrianov) finishing fourth.

Background

This was the 16th appearance of the men's individual all-around. The first individual all-around competition had been held in 1900, after the 1896 competitions featured only individual apparatus events. A men's individual all-around has been held every Games since 1900.

Five of the top 10 gymnasts from the 1968 Games returned: gold medalist Sawao Kato of Japan, silver medalist Mikhail Voronin of the Soviet Union, bronze medalist Akinori Nakayama of Japan, fourth-place finisher Eizo Kenmotsu of Japan, and seventh-place finisher Viktor Klimenko of the Soviet Union. Kenmotsu was the reigning (1970) World Champion, with teammates Mitsuo Tsukahara and Nakayama finishing second and third.

Liechtenstein, New Zealand, and North Korea each made their debut in the event. France and Italy both made their 14th appearance, tied for most among nations.

Competition format

All entrants in the gymnastics competitions performed both a compulsory exercise and a voluntary exercise for each apparatus. The scores for all 12 exercises were summed to give an individual all-around preliminary score. (One gymnast who entered the all-around competition did not perform on the vault.) Half of the scores from the preliminary carried over to the final, with the top 36 gymnasts advancing to the individual all-around final. There, each of the finalists performed another exercise on each apparatus. The sum of these scores plus half of the preliminary score resulted in a final total.

Each exercise was scored from 0 to 10; thus, the preliminary apparatus scores ranged from 0 to 20 each and the total preliminary score from 0 to 120. With half of the preliminary score and six more exercises scored 0 to 10, the final total was also from 0 to 120.

The preliminary exercise scores were also used for qualification for the apparatus finals. The two exercises (compulsory and voluntary) for each apparatus were summed to give an apparatus score; the top 6 in each apparatus participated in the finals; others were ranked 7th through 111th.

Schedule

All times are Central European Time (UTC+1)

Results

One-hundred thirteen gymnasts competed in the compulsory and optional rounds on 27 and 29 August. The thirty-six highest scoring gymnasts advanced to the final on 30 August. There was no limit as to how many competitors each country could have in the final. Half of the points earned by each gymnast during both the compulsory and optional rounds carried over to the final. This constitutes each gymnast's "prelim" score.

References

External links
Official Olympic Report
www.gymnasticsresults.com
www.gymn-forum.net

Men's artistic individual all-around
Men's events at the 1972 Summer Olympics